Moustapha Elhadji Diallo (born 14 May 1986) is a Senegalese former professional footballer who played as a midfielder. At international level, he made four appearances for the Senegal national team in 2009.

Club career

Early career
Born in Dakar, Diallo began his career with ASC Diaraf and played here until July 2006, when he moved to Belgian club Club Brugge K.V. for €125,000. Having signed a two-year contract with Club Brugge he hardly played and was part of the reserve team.

After one year he joined Spanish side Racing de Ferrol for an undisclosed fee. In January 2008, after six months, he returned to his home club ASC Diaraf of the Senegal Premier League.

Guingamp
In June 2009 Diallo signed a three-year contract with French club En Avant de Guingamp in the French second division.

Until May 2013, he played more than 100 games for Guingamp, and contributed to the promotion of the Breton club into the Ligue 1 in summer 2013.

Nîmes
In July 2018, Diallo signed a two-year contract with Nîmes Olympique, also of Ligue 1. On the first matchday of the 2018–19 season, in a match against Angers SCO, he suffered a blow to his left ankle. He made a further seven appearances for the club, one over the full 90 minutes, until matchday 8 on 30 September against Montpellier when he had to be substituted off at half-time.

In October 2018, after being handicapped by recurring pain in his left ankle, Diallo underwent extensive examinations. It was reported that Diallo's left ankle was worn and damaged and had no cartilage and that he was declared unfit for high-level practice which would force him to put an end to his career. In March 2019, Nîmes announced they had agreed the termination of his contract with Diallo who had been unable to play since sustaining the career-threatening injury. He was expected to retire.

International career
Diallo played for Senegal at the 2009 African Nations Championship in Ivory Coast. He was named in the "CHAN all-star 11" by the CAF.

Career statistics

International

Honours
Guingamp
 Coupe de France: 2013–14

References

External links
 

Living people
1986 births
Footballers from Dakar
Senegalese footballers
Senegal international footballers
Association football midfielders
Senegal A' international footballers
2009 African Nations Championship players
Belgian Pro League players
Ligue 1 players
Ligue 2 players
ASC Jaraaf players
Racing de Ferrol footballers
Club Brugge KV players
En Avant Guingamp players
Nîmes Olympique players
Senegalese expatriate footballers
Senegalese expatriate sportspeople in Spain
Expatriate footballers in Spain
Senegalese expatriate sportspeople in Belgium
Expatriate footballers in Belgium
Senegalese expatriate sportspeople in France
Expatriate footballers in France